The Landgraviate of Brabant (1085–1183) was a small medieval fiefdom west of Brussels, consisting of the area between the Dender and Zenne rivers in the Low Countries, then part of the Holy Roman Empire.

Before 1085 the land had belonged to Hermann II, Count Palatine of Lotharingia. Upon his death, Emperor Henry IV assigned it to Henry III, Count of Louvain and Brussels, granting him the Landgrave of Brabant. This is the earliest known use of the term Landgrave.

In 1183 the landgraviate of Brabant and the counties of Louvain and Brussels were formally merged and elevated together into the Duchy of Brabant, by Emperor Frederick Barbarossa; Henry I became the first Duke of Brabant.

The area made up part of South Brabant from 1815 to 1830 as part of the United Kingdom of the Netherlands, and part of the Belgian Province of Brabant from 1830 to 1996. It is currently in the western part of Flemish Brabant in the Flemish Region of Belgium.

Further reading
 Frans J. Van Droogenbroeck, "Het landgraafschap Brabant (1085-1183) en zijn paltsgrafelijke voorgeschiedenis. De territoriale en institutionele aanloop tot het ontstaan van het hertogdom Brabant", in De Hertog en de Staten, de Kanselier en de Raad, de Rekenkamer, het Leenhof, de Algemene Ontvangerij, de Drossaard en de Woudmeester, het Notariaat en het Landgraafschap Brabant. Acht bijdragen tot de studie van de instellingen in het Hertogdom Brabant in de Middeleeuwen en de Nieuwe Tijd, ed. Erik Aerts et al. (Brussels, 2011), pp. 161–176.

Duchy of Brabant
Counties of the Holy Roman Empire
States and territories established in 1085
States and territories disestablished in the 1180s
1085 establishments in Europe
1180s disestablishments in Europe